St. Dominic Catholic Church was established on the 20th of May, 1962 and is the only Catholic Church in south Florida named in honor of Saint Dominic of Guzman, a 13th-century Catholic saint and founder of the religious Order of Preachers. Located in 5909 NW 7th Street in Miami, Florida, St. Dominic Catholic Church forms part of the Roman Catholic Archdiocese of Miami. It consists of 118 parishes and spans a region as far north as Coral Springs and as far south as Key West, Florida.

History
Construction took place in stages. The first stage involved building momentum and initiating building drive programs. The second stage involved acquiring several buildings that were up for demolition in the summer of 1963. The third stage involved hiring an architect to oversee the moving, cutting, reassembling, and renovation of these transplanted buildings, which became the initial site of the first church, rectory, and school of religion. In the fourth stage, the Dominican Monastery in Downtown Miami closed and the Priests moved to St. Dominic (1968), effectively creating its current priory.  In the fifth stage, the church expanded and a statue and shrine of Our Lady of the Rosary was added (May 1971). In the sixth stage, a capital campaign was launched to build a larger church (1979). In the summer of 1979, the Most Reverend Archbishop Edward A . McCarthy  placed the cornerstone of the new church and by December of that same year  Altman-Myers Construction Company and the Mendoza-Estevez architect firm came on board. The final stage on March 15, 1981 saw the dedication of the Church, and most recently, in August 2011, its new stone altar was consecrated by Archbishop of Miami Thomas Wenski.

At first, the Spanish friars of Spain staffed St. Dominic parish, but in 1980 the pastoral care of the parish was entrusted to the Dominicans of the newly established Southern Province of St. Martin de Porres in the United States.  Although the presence of Spanish Dominican Friars in Florida dates back to mid 16th century, the Dominicans were formally established in the United States in 1805, by Fr. Edward Dominic Fenwick, OP. Since then, their presence  and ministry have grown. Today, the Dominican Friars have four provinces in the United States. St. Martin de Porres, the Southern Province, forms part of the four. The Dominican Friars who staff St. Dominic Catholic Church today have been running it since the church was first established in 1962.

Four Provinces of Dominican Friars
 St. Martin de Porres Province (Southern United States)
 St. Joseph the Worker Province (Eastern United States)
 Holy Name of Jesus Province (Western United States)
 St. Albert the Great Province (Central United States)

The Parish
The early history of St. Dominic parish is tied to the history of the Diocese of Miami.  The Diocese of Miami was created in August 1958, St. Dominic followed suit in May 1962.  Both experienced tumultuous times in their early years. Nearby Cuba just 90 miles away had just experienced its Communist revolution, thus creating an influx of Cuban refugees, which the new diocese and church had to contend with.  Black Americans were struggling for their civil rights; the Vietnam War was in process, and Vatican II had just “opened (its) windows” to Christ. Because of this, St. Dominic experienced a “storm of change” and expansion during its early years.

Parishioners have included natives and new settlers from the Northern United States, the Caribbean, Central and South America.  In its beginnings, St. Dominic parish served primarily an Anglo community. Today however, the parish serves a primarily Hispanic population.

There are numerous groups and movements within the parish of St. Dominic, including Emaus, Cursillos de Cristiandad, CCD (religious education), RCIA (adult religious education and preparation for the sacraments), Grupo de Oración (prayer group part of the Charismatic Renovation), and the FIRST Catholic Action group in the U.S.  Ministries include Music (both choral and show choirs), Ministers of the Word, Ministers of the Eucharist, and many others.  St. Dominic Parish opens its doors to everyone, there is a large number of parishioners that continue coming to Mass here and participating in activities here in spite of having moved to other areas of the city of Miami.  Numerous concerts and musical programs, as well as dinner dances and other events, help to keep the community together socially and raise funds for its upkeep and maintenance.

Art and design
St. Dominic's layout is semi-circular in nature. On the church's exterior there are ten stained glass windows in the shape of arches depicting important themes in Catholicism.  The entrance of the church consists of three major arches and underneath each arch there is a stone mosaic. The first mosaic from the left depicts the Dominican theologians that were important in the New World. The second and middle mosaic depicts Jesus "blessing and sending the 12 (Apostles) to announce the Good News" and St. Dominic welcoming the onlooker. The third mosaic on the right depicts a "boat bringing the first missionaries to the Florida peninsula." Both the stained glass windows and the arched mosaics were produced by the same artist, Father Domingo Iturgaiz from Navarre, Spain. The church roof is in the shape of a triangular spire and its summit contains an iron cross that is illuminated at night.  “Scalloping waves of barrel tiles” cover the roof.  From the church's interior one can better appreciate the beauty and the color of the stained glass windows.  The seating arrangement is also semi-circular and accommodates 850 persons.  There are six aisles that lead to the main altar.  On the altar area there is a baptismal font and an ambo (pulpit). On the back wall of the sanctuary hangs a cross and two statues, one of Mary and one of St. Joseph. Alongside the walls with the stained glass windows are the Stations of the Cross by Spanish artist Jose Luis Coomonte.

Church pastors
 Fr. Angel Viscarra, O.P.
 # Fr. Isidoro Vicente, O.P. 
 Fr. Restituto Perez, O.P.
 Fr. Alberto Rodriguez, O.P. (1986-1993)
 Fr. Jorge Presmanez, O.P. (1993-2003)t
 Fr. Alberto Rodriguez, O.P. (2003–2015)
 Fr. Eduardo Logiste OP (2015–present)

Gallery

References

External links
 Roman Catholic Archdiocese of Miami
 Dominican Friars of the Province of St. Martin de Porress
 The Florida Catholic Newspaper

Roman Catholic churches in Florida
Roman Catholic churches in Miami
Roman Catholic Archdiocese of Miami
Christian organizations established in 1962
1962 establishments in Florida